Osphronemus septemfasciatus is a species of freshwater ray-finned fish from the gourami family Osphronemidae. It is found in large slow-flowing rivers where it prefers the main channels, although juveniles occur in tributaries. It is endemic to the island of Borneo where it is found in Sarawak, Brunei Darussalam, Kalimantan Barat, Kalimantan Timur and Kalimantan Utara. The species reaches 50 cm (19.7 inches) in standard length and is known to be an obligate air-breather.

References

septemfasciatus
Fish described in 1992